NGC 475 is a lenticular galaxy in the constellation Pisces. It is located approximately 750 million light-years from Earth and has a diameter of roughly 125 thousand light-years. NGC 475 was discovered on November 3, 1864 by German astronomer Albert Marth.

See also  
 Lenticular galaxy 
 NGC 7007 
 List of NGC objects (1–1000)

References

External links 
 

Lenticular galaxies
Pisces (constellation)
0475
4796
Astronomical objects discovered in 1864